Oscar is a 1991 American comedy film directed by John Landis. Based on the Claude Magnier stage play, it is a remake of the 1967 French film of the same name, but set in Depression-era New York City. Oscar stars Sylvester Stallone, in a rare attempt at a comedic role, as Angelo "Snaps" Provolone, a mob boss who promises his dying father that he will leave the world of crime and become an honest businessman. Alongside Stallone, the film's cast includes Marisa Tomei, Ornella Muti, Tim Curry and Chazz Palminteri. Its score was composed by Elmer Bernstein.

According to Landis, Oscar was stylistically influenced by older Hollywood comedies, particularly those belonging to the "screwball" genre, which were popular during the period in which the film takes place. Oscar was released in the United States on April 26, 1991, and received mixed reviews from critics.

Plot
In the prologue, gangster Angelo "Snaps" Provolone promises his dying father that he will give up a life of crime, and instead "go straight".

A month later, Snaps awakes at his mansion and begins his important morning. He has a meeting with several prominent bankers, as he hopes to donate a large sum of cash and join the bank's board of trustees, thereby having an honest job and keeping his word to his father. Anthony Rossano, Snaps's young, good-natured accountant, arrives at the mansion, asks for a 250% raise, and tells his boss that he is in love with "Snaps' daughter". Snaps is furious, does not want his daughter marrying Anthony, and goes to talk to his daughter, Lisa.

The only child of Snaps and Sofia, Lisa is a spoiled daughter whose dreams of seeing the world's great sights run into a roadblock because of her overly protective father. Wishing to move out of the house, she lies to her parents at the suggestion of the maid, Nora, and claims to be pregnant. Snaps, believing the father to be Anthony (as he wants to marry "Snaps' daughter"), is shocked when Lisa says the father is Oscar, the former chauffeur who is now serving overseas in the military.

Things get even more complicated when Anthony learns that Theresa, the woman he fell in love with, is not actually Snaps' daughter as she had claimed to be. Before Anthony can catch on, Snaps tricks him into agreeing to marry his actual daughter, Lisa, who is supposedly pregnant but without a husband. Both Lisa and Anthony are unhappy at the hasty arrangement, and the pair luck out when Lisa falls in love with someone else: Dr. Thornton Poole, Snaps's dialectician, whose frequent world travels appeal to her adventurous nature.

Meanwhile, local police lieutenant Toomey is keeping an eye on the mansion, believing that Snaps is meeting with Chicago mobsters soon. Also watching Snaps is mob rival Vendetti, who also believes that Snaps is meeting Chicago mobsters. Vendetti plans a hit on Snaps in the early afternoon while Toomey plans a raid at the same time to catch Snaps red-handed.

While Anthony seeks out Theresa, Snaps meets his mansion's new maid, Roxie. As it turns out, Roxie is an old flame of Snaps, and the pair talk memories and the life that never was. Theresa comes to the mansion and is revealed to be Roxie's daughter — who was actually fathered by Snaps long ago — making Snaps her dad after all. The impromptu celebration of both his daughters' engagements is cut short by the arrival of the bankers. During the meeting, Snaps senses the bankers are giving him a raw deal — they do not intend to give him any actual influence in the bank's operations, despite the money he is willing to invest. The meeting is interrupted by police officers and Toomey, who is embarrassed to find no money or gangsters present on site. He leaves the mansion just in time for Vendetti's car full of armed men to crash right outside. Toomey smiles at reporters and arrests the men.

Despite his father's wishes, Snaps realizes that he would rather deal with gangsters and gunmen than "respectable" bankers, and decides to abandon his short-lived honest ways and return to a life of crime. The final scene of the movie shows a double wedding for both his daughters. Oscar himself finally appears and objects to Lisa's marriage, but he is carried off by Snaps' men and the weddings end happily.

Cast

 Sylvester Stallone as Angelo "Snaps" Provolone
 Ornella Muti as Sofia Provolone
 Don Ameche as Father Clemente
 Peter Riegert as Aldo
 Tim Curry as Dr. Thornton Poole
 Vincent Spano as Anthony Rossano
 Marisa Tomei as Lisa Provolone
 Eddie Bracken as Five-Spot Charlie
 Linda Gray as Roxanne
 Chazz Palminteri as Connie
 Kurtwood Smith as Lt. Toomey
 Art LaFleur as Officer Quinn  
 Robert Lesser as Officer Keough
 Yvonne De Carlo as Aunt Rosa
 Martin Ferrero as Luigi Finucci
 Harry Shearer as Guido Finucci
 Richard Romanus as Vendetti
 Arleen Sorkin as Vendetti's Manicurist  
 Joey Travolta as Ace 
 Jim Mulholland as Oscar
 Kirk Douglas as Eduardo Provolone
 Elizabeth Barondes as Theresa
 Joycelyn O'Brien as Nora

Production

Development and writing
According to director John Landis, the film was influenced by comedies released around the era in which the film is set, with humor and dialogue delivered in a manner reminiscent of old Hollywood comedies, particularly the "screwball" genre.

Landis' first choice for the lead role was Al Pacino, who was going to be paid $2 million for the role but was then offered $3 million to appear in Dick Tracy. "He was very upfront about it, he said he was going to go for the money," said Landis. "I think Oscar would've been a much better movie with Al, but there you go."

Stallone later said he should have played "Snaps", his character in the film, "incredibly cynical like in the original French version".

Music
The film score was composed by Elmer Bernstein and is based around Gioachino Rossini's Barber of Seville. In the Varèse Sarabande edition of the film soundtrack, Landis penned liner notes about the development of the score:

The opening track is "Largo Al Factotum" from The Barber of Seville, performed by Earle Patriarco. The track "Cops and Real Crooks" includes "Finucci Piano Boogie," composed and performed by Ralph Grierson. The soundtrack also contained four pre-existing songs which appeared in the film: "Sweet Georgia Brown" (performed by Bing Crosby); "Rockin' in Rhythm" (performed by Duke Ellington & His Orchestra); "Tea for Two" (performed by Fred Waring & His Pennsylvanians); and "Plain Dirt" (performed by McKinney's Cotton Pickers).

 "Largo Al Factotum" (performed by Earle Patriarco) (4:42)
 "Grifting" (5:43)
 "Lisa Dreams" (3:46)
 "Tea and Romance" (4:29)
 "Revelations" (5:27)
 "Cops and Real Crooks" (composed and performed by Ralph Grierson) (5:45)
 "Sweet Georgia Brown" - Bing Crosby (2:54)
 "Rockin' in Rhythm" - Duke Ellington and His Orchestra (3:21)
 "Tea for Two" - Fred Waring and His Pennsylvanians (3:21)
 "Plain Dirt" - McKinney's Cotton Pickers  (2:38)

Release

Theatrical
The film was released theatrically in the United States on April 26, 1991, and had nine international releases from June until September.

Home media
Oscar was released on VHS on September 11, 1991, followed by a LaserDisc edition on November 11. The film was released on DVD on May 6, 2003, and later received a Blu-ray release by Kino Lorber on September 5, 2018.

Reception

Critical response
On review aggregator website Rotten Tomatoes, the film holds a 12% approval rating based on 17 reviews, with an average rating of 3.70/10. On Metacritic, the film has a weighted average score of 47 out of 100, indicating "mixed or average reviews".

Contemporary reviews
Oscar received mixed reviews from critics upon release. Dave Kehr of the Chicago Tribune wrote, "Landis does his best to give the material a cartoonlike rhythm and stylized sense of movement ... but the labored, repetitive screenplay, by Michael Barrie and Jim Mulholland, defeats him." He continued, "For a film meant to define a lighter and fresher image for Stallone, Oscar doesn't quite get the job done." Owen Gleiberman of Entertainment Weekly gave the film a grade of "D+", writing: "Director John Landis executes the mechanics of farce without a trace of the speed or effervescence this material demands. Every chuckle feels engineered."

Conversely, Tribune reviewer Gene Siskel gave the film a score of three out of four stars. While he described the first reel as "disastrous," he added that the film included "truly funny work by enormously talented supporting players." Roger Ebert was in full agreement with Siskel on Siskel & Ebert & the Movies and they gave the film "two thumbs up". Variety stated the film was an "intermittently amusing throwback to gangster comedies of the 1930s. While dominated by star Sylvester Stallone and heavy doses of production and costume design, pic is most distinguished by sterling turns by superb character actors." Kathleen Maher of The Austin Chronicle gave the film three out of five stars, commending Stallone's performance: "I'm not used to having much good to say about the guy, but Stallone has evidenced a nascent sense of humor before, and here he allows it to blossom."

Audiences polled by CinemaScore gave the film an average grade of "B" on an A+ to F scale.

Oscar was nominated for three Razzie Awards at the 12th Golden Raspberry Awards in 1992: Worst Actor (Sylvester Stallone), Worst Director (John Landis) and Worst Supporting Actress (Marisa Tomei).

Retrospective assessments
In 2017, director John Landis said:

Speaking with ComicBook.com in support of his show Tulsa King, Stallone says he still loves Oscar in spite of its lukewarm reception: “I guess it was too much of a shocking transition from Rambo to that, but I love doing that kind of drama.“

In 2020, Lee Pfeiffer of Cinema Retro wrote that "Oscar was a box office flop and critics attacked it across the board. However, it has aged very well and I found it to be a delight throughout. Give it chance, will ya?"

References

External links
 
 
 
 
 

1991 films
Touchstone Pictures films
1990s crime comedy films
1990s screwball comedy films
Films set in the 1930s
Mafia comedy films
American screwball comedy films
Films scored by Elmer Bernstein
Films directed by John Landis
Films set in New York City
1990s English-language films
American remakes of French films
American films based on plays
1991 comedy films
1990s American films